Sipanik is a village in the Masis Municipality of the Ararat Province of Armenia.

References

External links 

Populated places in Ararat Province